Paul Dempsey (born 20 April 1971) is an Irish Roman Catholic prelate who has served as Bishop of Achonry since 2020.

Early life and education 
Dempsey was born in Carlow on 20 April 1971, the youngest of four children to Tony and Berry Dempsey. He moved with his family to Athy, County Kildare, in 1978, where he attended the local Christian Brothers primary school and secondary school at the local Christian Brothers secondary school, Scoil Eoin. 

Dempsey studied for the priesthood in Milltown Institute, St Patrick's, Carlow College and All Hallows College.

He was ordained a priest for the Diocese of Kildare and Leighlin on 6 July 1997.

Presbyteral ministry 
Following ordination, Dempsey's first pastoral appointment was as a curate in Clane and Rathcoffey. Seven years later, he was appointed curate in Kildare, and simultaneously as diocesan youth director and director of vocations. During his time as diocesan youth director, Dempsey organised two World Youth Day pilgrimages in 2005 and 2008. It was during his curacy in Kildare that he also started writing a weekly article in the Leinster Leader and presenting Religion Matters, a religious and social affairs program on Kfm.

Dempsey returned to the Milltown Institute for further studies, completing a master's degree in theology in 2008. His thesis examined whether the Catholic Church in contemporary Ireland was a church in crisis or in question.

Dempsey was appointed to the parish cluster of Naas, Sallins and Two Mile House in 2009, before moving to Newbridge in August 2014, when he was also appointed vicar forane for the North deanery. The following year, Dempsey was appointed parish priest in Newbridge and simultaneously administrator in Caragh and Prosperous. 

In a December 2010 article for The Furrow on being a priest in modern Ireland, Dempsey wrote that “the Church community needs to enter into a period of deep reflection”, adding that it would be “refreshing to see some leadership around this ‘reflection’ culminating in some form of national Church gathering", and noting his awareness of major issues in the church, such as the role of women and the appointment of bishops.

Episcopal ministry 
Dempsey was appointed Bishop-elect of Achonry by Pope Francis on 27 January 2020. His episcopal ordination was initially scheduled to take place on 19 April, but was rescheduled on 17 June due to the COVID-19 pandemic.

Dempsey was eventually consecrated by the Archbishop of Tuam, Michael Neary, on 30 August in the Cathedral of the Annunciation of the Blessed Virgin Mary and St Nathy, Ballaghaderreen.

In response to a document published by the Congregation for the Doctrine of the Faith in March 2021, Dempsey released a statement on 26 March 2021 in which he referred to language in the document banning blessings for same-sex couples as "hurtful".

References

External links 

 Bishop Paul Dempsey on Catholic-Hierarchy.org
 Bishop Paul Dempsey on GCatholic

People from County Carlow
Living people
1971 births
Alumni of Milltown Institute of Theology and Philosophy
Alumni of All Hallows College, Dublin
Alumni of Carlow College
21st-century Roman Catholic bishops in Ireland
Roman Catholic bishops of Achonry
21st-century Irish bishops